Maurice Terrier was a French cyclist. He competed in the men's sprint event at the 1900 Summer Olympics.

References

External links
 

Year of birth missing
Year of death missing
French male cyclists
Olympic cyclists of France
Cyclists at the 1900 Summer Olympics
Place of birth missing
Place of death missing